Amanda Carr may refer to:
 Amanda Carr (ice hockey) (born 1990), British ice hockey player
 Amanda Carr (BMX rider) (born 1990), Thai BMX cyclist